The Huayquerías Formation is a Late Miocene fossiliferous geological formation of the Frontal Cordillera and Cuyo Basin of Argentina. The formation crops out in the central Mendoza Province.

The tuff in the formation is dated to 5.84 ± 0.41 Ma, placing it in the Huayquerian SALMA,  the age named after the formation by Kraglievitch in 1934.

The formation has provided fossils of the procyonid Cyonasua pascuali and the litoptern Huayqueriana cristata, named after the formation.

Description 
The Huayqueriás Formation, present in the Frontal Cordillera and the neighboring Cuyo Basin, was described in 1934 by Kraglievitch as the basis for the Huayquerian South American land mammal age. The name Huayquerías means "badlands". The formation comprises reddish mudstones with mudcracks, paleoburrows and ichnofossils of vertebrates. The tuff has been dated using 40K/40Ar analysis to 5.84 ± 0.41 Ma.

Paleontological significance 

The Huayquerías Formation has been used to define the Huayquerian South American land mammal age, ranging from 9.0 to 6.8 Ma. However, later analysis of the ashfall bed in the formation, provided a much younger age of 5.84 ± 0.41 Ma, extending the temporal range of the Huayquerian SALMAans until near the Miocene-Pliocene limit. The Huayqueriás Formation has provided fossils of Cyonasua pascuali, and the litoptern Huayqueriana cristata, the latter of which, named after the formation.

See also 
 South American land mammal age

References

Bibliography 
Geology
 
 
 

Paleontology
 
 

Geologic formations of Argentina
 
Montehermosan
Messinian
Miocene Series of South America
Neogene Argentina
Mudstone formations
Tuff formations
Sandstone formations
Fluvial deposits
Fossiliferous stratigraphic units of South America
Paleontology in Argentina
Geology of Mendoza Province